Angel Airlines may refer to:

Angel Airlines (Romania)
Angel Airlines (Thailand)